Schmidt number (Sc) is a dimensionless number defined as the ratio of momentum diffusivity (kinematic viscosity) and mass diffusivity, and it is used to characterize fluid flows in which there are simultaneous momentum and mass diffusion convection processes. It was named after German engineer Ernst Heinrich Wilhelm Schmidt (1892–1975).

The Schmidt number is the ratio of the shear component for diffusivity viscosity/density to the diffusivity for mass transfer D. It physically relates the relative thickness of the hydrodynamic layer and mass-transfer boundary layer.

It is defined as:

where:
  is the kinematic viscosity or (/) in units of (m2/s)
  is the mass diffusivity (m2/s).
  is the dynamic viscosity of the fluid (Pa·s or N·s/m2 or kg/m·s)
  is the density of the fluid (kg/m3).
The heat transfer analog of the Schmidt number is the Prandtl number (Pr). The ratio of thermal diffusivity to mass diffusivity is the Lewis number (Le).

Turbulent Schmidt Number
The turbulent Schmidt number is commonly used in turbulence research and is defined as:

where:
  is the eddy viscosity in units of (m2/s)
  is the eddy diffusivity (m2/s).

The turbulent Schmidt number describes the ratio between the rates of turbulent transport of momentum and the turbulent transport of mass (or any passive scalar). It is related to the turbulent Prandtl number, which is concerned with turbulent heat transfer rather than turbulent mass transfer. It is useful for solving the mass transfer problem of turbulent boundary layer flows. The simplest model for Sct is the Reynolds analogy, which yields a turbulent Schmidt number of 1. From experimental data and CFD simulations, Sct ranges from 0.2 to 6. An assessment of the existing literature on the subject still indicates significant uncertainty concerning the correct specification of this variable. Stemming from the experimental and numerical evidence of its local variability, a new formulation for the turbulent Schmidt number, consisting in computing it locally, was proposed. Through the latter, directly depending on the strain-rate and the vorticity invariants, a stronger relation between the concentration and the turbulence fields was finally ensured. Other research showed a strong dependency on the Peclet number, with high turbulent Schmidt numbers for low Péclet numbers and vice versa.

Stirling engines
For Stirling engines, the Schmidt number is related to the specific power.
Gustav Schmidt of the German Polytechnic Institute of Prague published an analysis in 1871 for the now-famous closed-form solution for an idealized isothermal Stirling engine model.

where:
  is the Schmidt number
  is the heat transferred into the working fluid
  is the mean pressure of the working fluid
  is the volume swept by the piston.

References

Dimensionless numbers of fluid mechanics
Dimensionless numbers of thermodynamics
Fluid dynamics